Raken-e Olya (also Romanized as Rāken-e ‘Olyā; also known as Rāken-e Bālā) is a village in Dorud Rural District, in the Central District of Dorud County, Lorestan Province, Iran. At the 2006 census, its population was 43, in 7 families.

References 

Towns and villages in Dorud County